Artan Bano (born 17 February 1966 in Lushnja) is a retired Albanian international football player, who currently is head coach at Albanian Second Division side Egnatia Rrogozhinë.

International career
He made his debut for Albania in a February 1993 FIFA World Cup qualification match at home against Northern Ireland and earned a total of 7 caps, scoring no goals. His final international was an August 1996 friendly match against Greece.

Honours
Albanian Superliga: 1
 1993

References

External sources
 
 Profile at Playerhistory.
 
 Stats from Slovenia at PrvaLiga.
 

1966 births
Living people
Sportspeople from Lushnjë
Association football midfielders
Albanian footballers
Albania international footballers
FK Partizani Tirana players
NK Pazinka players
NK Svoboda Ljubljana players
KS Lushnja players
Besa Kavajë players
Albanian expatriate footballers
Expatriate footballers in Slovenia
Albanian expatriate sportspeople in Slovenia
Expatriate footballers in Croatia
Albanian expatriate sportspeople in Croatia
Albanian football managers
KS Lushnja managers
FK Tomori Berat managers
Shkumbini Peqin managers
FK Egnatia managers
Kategoria Superiore players
Kategoria Superiore managers